Horizon Church, founded as Sutherland AOG, and formerly more recently Shirelive, is a Pentecostal Christian church affiliated with Australian Christian Churches, the Australian branch of the Assemblies of God denomination. The church's main campus is in the commercial district of Sutherland, a southern suburb of Sydney, New South Wales. The church's senior pastors are Brad and Alison Bonhomme, and the former Prime Minister of Australia, Scott Morrison, is a member of the congregation.

History
Horizon Church was created by the Assemblies of God in Australia in 1949, under Pastor Norm Armstrong. The first meeting was in the Sutherland School of Arts Hall. In the early 1950s the church was built at its current location at 7-9 Stapleton Avenue, Sutherland.

The church was founded as Sutherland AOG, being renamed the Christian Growth Centre. In 2000 it became a company limited by guarantee, changing its name to Shire Christian Centre. In May 2006 the church was again rebranded, this time as Shirelive.

In 2007, the church undertook a building project which consisted of stage one, major demolition of existing auditorium, youth centre with the construction of a new 1090-seat convention centre.

On 20 October 2013, pastors Brad and Alison Bonhomme were appointed as the senior pastors of Shirelive, and in 2018 the church changed its name to Horizon Church.

Governance
The church, as a limited company, provides reports to ASIC and the ACNC, and is governed by a board of directors.

Beliefs and practices
As a Pentecostal and evangelical church, Horizon is not a mainstream church in Australia. Some members believe in divine healing, and practise "speaking in tongues", which is seen as a miraculous gift from God.

Locations
Apart from the "mother church" in Sutherland, Horizon also has churches in Dunsborough, Western Australia and St Andrews, New South Wales, with a new campus launched on Rote Island, Indonesia, in 2022, and a new one planned for Western Sydney in 2022. Services are also held online.

People
The former Prime Minister of Australia, Scott Morrison, and his family are members of the Horizon congregation.

References

External links

Australian Christian Churches
Evangelical megachurches in Australia
Pentecostal churches in Sydney
Christian organizations established in 1957